Out of Wonder: Poems Celebrating Poets was a 2017 collection of poems for children's by Kwame Alexander with co-authors Chris Colderley and Marjory Wentworth and illustrated by Ekua Holmes. The book won the 2018 Coretta Scott King Illustrator Award. Each of the 20 poems is written in tribute to and in the style of a well known poet.

References 

2017 children's books
American picture books